Hazaribagh Road is a railway station on the Grand Chord line of East Central Railway. The place is locally known as Sariya (or Suriya), in Sariya CD Block in Bagodar-Saria subdivision in Giridih district in the Indian state of Jharkhand.

Geography

History
With the extension of railways to Barakar in 1856, that town became the railhead for the vast hinterland that lay beyond it. In 1871,  was connected to Madhupur on the Howrah–Delhi main line, through a branch line. Giridih served as the railhead for Hazaribagh and other places in the area till the Grand Chord line was laid. Hazaribagh Road station, along with the Grand Chord, was opened in February 1907 (1906 according to some railway related sources). Hazaribagh Road was, however, the station ordinarily used, as it was considerably nearer to Kolkata.

Electrification
The Gomoh–Koderma sector was electrified in 1961–62.

References

External links
  Train arrivals at Hazaribagh Road

Dhanbad railway division
Railway stations in Giridih district
Railway stations opened in 1907
Hazaribagh